The 1995–96 World Series was a One Day International (ODI) cricket tri-series where Australia played host to Sri Lanka and West Indies. Australia and Sri Lanka reached the Finals, which Australia won 2–0. Sri Lanka and West Indies contested the tri-series for the first time since the 1984-85 season

Squads

Points table

Result summary

Final series
Australia won the best of three final series against Sri Lanka 2–0.

External links
 Series home at Cricinfo

References

Australian Tri-Series
1995 in Australian cricket
1995 in Sri Lankan cricket
1995 in West Indian cricket
1995–96 Australian cricket season
1996 in Australian cricket
1996 in Sri Lankan cricket
1996 in West Indian cricket
International cricket competitions from 1994–95 to 1997
1995–96
1995–96